Nathalie Etzensperger-Nanzer, née Nanzer (born 6 August 1968), is a female Swiss ski mountaineer and long-distance runner.

Etzensperger was born in Gamsen, where she grew up. She started top-class sports at the age of 24 years, and is married with three children.

Selected results

Ski mountaineering 
 2006:
 2nd, World Championship relay race (together with Gabrielle Magnenat, Catherine Mabillard and Séverine Pont-Combe)
 7th, World Championship vertical race
 2007:
 3rd, European Championship team race (together with Catherine Mabillard)
 3rd, European Championship relay race (together with Gabrielle Magnenat and Catherine Mabillard)
 3rd, European Championship combination ranking
 5th, European Championship single race
 5th, European Championship vertical race
 2008:
 1st, World Championship relay race (together with Gabrielle Magnenat, Marie Troillet and Séverine Pont-Combe)
 2nd, World Championship team race (together with Séverine Pont-Combe)
 3rd, World Championship vertical race
 3rd, World Championship long distance
 3rd, World Championship combination ranking
 4th, World Championship single race
 2009:
 2nd, European Championship team race (together with Gabrielle Magnenat)
 2nd, European Championship relay race (together with Gabrielle Magnenat and Séverine Pont-Combe)
 3rd, European Championship combination ranking
 4th, European Championship single race
 5th, European Championship vertical race
 1st, Trophée des Gastlosen, together with Séverine Pont-Combe
 2010:
 2nd, World Championship relay race (together with Marie Troillet and Gabrielle Magnenat)
 2nd, World Championship team race (together with Marie Troillet)
 3rd, World Championship combination ranking
 4th, World Championship single race
 7th, World Championship vertical race
 2011:
 1st, World Championship team race (together with Marie Troillet)
 1st, World Championship relay race (together with Gabrielle Gachet, née Magnenat, and Mireille Richard)
 1st, World Championship vertical, total ranking
 2nd, World Championship sprint
 3rd, World Championship single race
 4th, World Championship vertical race
 2012:
 2nd, Patrouille de la Maya, together with Marie Troillet and Gabrielle Gachet, née Magnenat

Patrouille des Glaciers 

 2004: 5th, together with Lucia Näfen and Brigitte Wolf
 2008: 1st and course record, together with Gabrielle Magnenat and Séverine Pont-Combe
 2010: 1st and course record, together with Émilie Gex-Fabry and Marie Troillet

Pierra Menta 

 2008: 1st,together with Laëtitia Roux

Trofeo Mezzalama 

 2011: 2nd, together with Laëtitia Roux and Mireia Miró Varela

Running 
 2001:
 1st, Jeizibärg-Lauf, Gampel
 2004:
 1st, Zermatt marathon
 1st (women I), Jeizibärg-Lauf, Gampel
 3rd (F30), Matterhorn run
 2005:
 1st and course record, Aletsch half marathon
 1st (women I), Jeizibärg-Lauf, Gampel
 1st, Jeizibärg-Lauf & Dérupe Trophy
 2006:
 1st, Aletsch half marathon
 2nd (women II), Jeizibärg-Lauf, GampelEtzensperger also competed in the 2006 European Mountain Running Championship.
 2007:
 2nd, Jeizibärg-Lauf, Gampel
 2008:
 1st (women 1) Jeizibärg-Lauf / Valais Mountain Running Championship, Gampel
 1st (women 1), Dérupe Vercorin
 2nd (F40), Matterhorn run
 2009:
 1st (F40), Matterhorn run
 2010:
 3rd (F40), Matterhorn run

External links 
 Nathalie Etzensperger at skimountaineering.org

References 

1968 births
Living people
Swiss female ski mountaineers
World ski mountaineering champions
Swiss female long-distance runners
Swiss female mountain runners
People from Brig District
Sportspeople from Valais